Alley Boys F.C., better known as the Harrison Alley Boys, was a U.S. soccer team of the early twentieth century.  It spent one season in the National Association Football League, winning the 1915-1916 championship.

History
The Alley Boys played in Harrison, New Jersey an early hot bed of U.S. soccer.  They were an established team by 1908 and played in the Inter-city Soccer Football League becoming champions in 1912-13.  In 1914, they went to the third round of the National Challenge Cup and finished the season undefeated in the New Jersey State Amateur football league with a record of 22-0-0.  In 1915, the Alley Boys joined the National Association Football League.  The New York Times wrote regarding a victory over Brooklyn F.C. early in the season, “the victory was especially popular because the Alley Boys team is made up of native American players.”  That season, they won the NAFBL championship, but withdrew from the league during the off season.  The team remained active through 1917 when they defeated Fulton A.C. in the second round of the National Challenge Cup in November.

Year-by-year

Honors
League Championship
 Winner (1): 1915

References

External links
 National Association Football League standings

Defunct soccer clubs in New Jersey
National Association Football League teams
Association football clubs established in 1908
Sports in Hudson County, New Jersey
Soccer in New Jersey